Notarikon ( Noṭriqōn) is a Talmudic and Kabbalistic  method of deriving a word, by using each of its initial or final letters to stand for another, to form a sentence or idea out of the words.  Another variation uses the first and last letters, or the two middle letters of a word, in order to form another word. The word "notarikon" is borrowed from the Greek language (νοταρικόν), and was derived from the Latin word "notarius" meaning "shorthand writer."

Notarikon is one of the three ancient methods used by the Kabbalists (the other two are gematria and temurah) to rearrange words and sentences. These methods were used in order to derive the esoteric substratum and deeper spiritual meaning of the words in the Bible. Notarikon was also used in alchemy.

The term is mostly used in the context of Kabbalah. Common Hebrew abbreviations are described by ordinary linguistic terms.

Usage in the Talmud 
Until the end of the Talmudic period, Notariqon is understood in Judaism as a common method of Scripture interpretation by which the letters of individual words in the Bible text indicate the first letters of independent words. For example, the consonants of the word nimreṣet (1Kgs 2:8) produce the words noʾef (adulterer), moʾābı (Moabite), roṣeaḥ (murderer), ṣorer (threatener) and tôʿbāh (horror). According to a Talmudic interpretation, the starting word indicates the insults which Shimei had thrown at King David.

Usage in Kabbalah 
A common usage of Notarikon in the practice of Kabbalah, is to form sacred names of God derived from religious or biblical verses. Agla, an acronym for Atah Gibor Le-olam Adonai, translated, "You, O Lord, are mighty forever," is one of the most famous examples of Notarikon. Dozens of examples are found in the Berit Menuchah, as is referenced in the following passage:

And it was discovered that the Malachim were created from the wind and the fine and enlightening air, and that the name of their origin עַמַרֻמְאֵליוְהָ was derived from the verse (Psalms 104:4): "Who makest the winds thy messengers, fire and flame thy ministers" (…) And when the lights reach this Sefira, they unite and receive a name that is derived from the central letters of the following verse (Genesis 6:2): "The sons of God saw that the daughters of men were fair; and they took to wife such of them as they chose."

Sefer Gematriot is another example where many Notarikons for usage on talismans are given from Biblical verses.

See also 
 AGLA, notarikon for Atah Gibor Le-olam Adonai
 Bible code, a purported set of secret messages encoded within the Torah.
 Biblical and Talmudic units of measurement
 Chol HaMoed, the intermediate days during Passover and Sukkot.
 Chronology of the Bible
 Counting of the Omer
 Gematria, Jewish system of assigning numerical value to a word or phrase.
 Hebrew acronyms
 Hebrew calendar
 Hebrew numerals
 Jewish and Israeli holidays 2000–2050
 Lag BaOmer, 33rd day of counting the Omer.
 Sephirot, the 10 attributes/emanations found in Kabbalah.
 Significance of numbers in Judaism
 Weekly Torah portion, division of the Torah into 54 portions.

References

Alchemical processes
Hebrew words and phrases
History of cryptography
Kabbalistic words and phrases
Greek words and phrases
Language and mysticism